Amblyseius meghriensis is a species of mite in the family Phytoseiidae.

References

meghriensis
Articles created by Qbugbot
Animals described in 1968